The Palisades Interstate Parkway Police (PIPPD), is a New Jersey state law enforcement agency, the duties of which are to protect and to enforce state and city laws within New Jersey and New York, as well as all facilities owned or operated by the Palisades Interstate Park Commission, an interstate government agency responsible for protecting the Palisades Interstate Park as well as the Palisades Interstate Parkway.

Controversies 
In May 2018, State Assemblyman Gordon Johnson suggested instituting state oversight of the department.

After a number of press reports of misconduct, the Bergen County Prosecutor's Office conducted an investigation that led to Chief Michael Coppola being suspended for ninety days starting in mid-July 2018. The prosecutor found the department had an incentive program to encourage officers to write more traffic tickets. 

The investigation also showed that most of the department's high-speed chases were in violation of the State Attorney General's policy on such pursuits. At least one of these resulted in a fatal crash.

In August 2018, Coppola resigned after he was arrested for allegedly buying cocaine and having it shipped to his post office box.  He was replaced by Steven Shallop.

See also 

List of law enforcement agencies in New Jersey
List of law enforcement agencies in New York
Port Authority of New York and New Jersey Police Department
New York State Police
New Jersey State Police

References

External links

State law enforcement agencies of New York (state)
State law enforcement agencies of New Jersey
Law enforcement in the New York metropolitan area
Palisades Interstate Park system
Specialist police departments of New Jersey
Specialist police departments of New York (state)